The Albany River is a river in Northern Ontario, Canada, which flows northeast from Lake St. Joseph in Northwestern Ontario and empties into James Bay. Major tributaries include the Kenogami River and Ogoki River.

The river was named after James, Duke of York and Albany, who later became King James II of England.

History

Since the Albany extends far to the west, its mouth is a natural site for a trading post. See Canadian canoe routes. Trade in the area was long contested by the English from Hudson Bay and the French on the Great Lakes. In 1674 Charles Bayly of the Hudson's Bay Company (HBC) became the first European to see the Albany. Sometime before 1679 the HBC founded Fort Albany at the mouth of the river. In 1685 the French built Fort des Français at the future site of Henley House. In 1743 Henley House was established  upriver at the mouth of the Kenogami River. In 1775-76 Edward Jarvis from Henley House explored the relation between the Kenogami and the Missinaibi Rivers and went down to Michipicoten on Lake Superior. In 1779 Philip Turnor surveyed as far as Gloucester House. In 1786 Osnaburgh House was built near the outlet of Lake St. Joseph. By 1790 or so the Fort Albany trade extended all the way to Lake Winnipeg.

The land north of the Albany River was part of the Northwest Territories until 1912, when it was transferred to Ontario in the Ontario Boundaries Extension Act, 1912.

Geography
The Albany River is the boundary between Kenora District to the north and the Thunder Bay and Cochrane Districts to the south.

From there it flows via a Main Channel (northern) and South Channel around Kagami Island northeast, and takes in the right tributary Misehkow River and left tributary Etowamami River. The river continues over the Upper Eskakwa Falls, takes in the right tributary Shabuskwia River, and travels over the Eskakwa Falls and Snake Falls.

The river empties into the Akimiski Strait on James Bay via a series of channels. The community of Fort Albany lies on a southern channel and the Kashechewan First Nation on a northern one.

The river is navigable for the first .

Watershed
For much of its length, the river defines the boundary between Kenora District and Thunder Bay & Cochrane Districts.

There are three diversions in the Albany River watershed, all diverting water from the James Bay drainage basin and all undertaken as part of hydroelectric projects.

Tributaries

Pagashi River (L)
Cheepay River (R)
Henley River (L)
Streatfeild River (R)
Kenogami River (R)
Ogoki River (R)
Shabuskwia River (R)
Etowamami River (L)
Misehkow River (R)
Lake St. Joseph
Cat River

Communities
Communities along the river in upstream order:
Kashechewan First Nation
Fort Albany
Ghost River, an unincorporated place at the confluence with the Cheepay River
Ogoki Post, Marten Falls (Marten Falls First Nation)
Eabametoong First Nation / Fort Hope, just off the main river on Eabamet Lake, connected by the Eabamet River
Osnaburgh (Mishkeegogamang First Nation)

Islands

Several islands are found other channels of the river as it flows out to James Bay:

 Albany Island
 Anderson Island
 Big Island
 Farfad Island (Nunavut)
 Faries Island
 Kakago Island
 Linklater Island

A number of islands upstream from Fort Albany:

 Blackbear Island
 Cheepay Island
 Comb Island
 Fishing Creek Island
 Hat Island
 Norran Island
 Oldman Island
 Sand Cherry Island

Albany River Provincial Park

The Albany River Provincial Park protects the river and its banks from Osnaburgh Lake to the confluence with the Wabassi River. It was established in 1989 and used for backcountry canoe-camping. Features include rugged Precambrian bedrock, moraines, drumlins, and a variety of water-shaped landforms.

It is a non-operating park, meaning that there are no facilities or services. Visitors have to be experienced in travelling through isolated wilderness.

See also 
List of longest rivers of Canada
List of Ontario rivers

References

Sources

External links 

 Albany River Provincial Park - Ontario Parks

Rivers of Kenora District
Rivers of Thunder Bay District
Rivers of Cochrane District
Tributaries of James Bay